Chacabuco Partido is a partido in the northern part of Buenos Aires Province in Argentina.

Economy
The economy of Chacabuco is dominated by agriculture. The mainstays of agricultural production in the district are soya beans, wheat and maize. There are also a lot of cattle farms in the area, as well as secondary agricultural industries such as windmill and silo maintenance, building and carpentry.

The region is also home to a chemical plant.

Settlements
Chacabuco, 34,958 inhabitants
Castilla, 1,316 inhabitants
Coliqueo y Membrillar
Cucha Cucha
Gregorio Villafañe
Ingeniero Silveyra
O'Higgins, 1,347 inhabitants
Los Ángeles, 124 inhabitants
Rawson, 1,732 inhabitants
San Patricio

External links

 
El Urbano de Chacabuco

1865 establishments in Argentina
Partidos of Buenos Aires Province